Carly Hughes is an American actress and singer, known for her role in the ABC comedy series, American Housewife (2016-2020).

Early life
Hughes was born in St. Louis, Missouri and raised in Columbia, Maryland. Her first stage role was playing Robin Hood in Clemens Crossing Elementary School in fifth grade. She went on to Wilde Lake High School, and graduated from Pennsylvania State University in 2004 with a degree in musical theater.

Career
She began her career appearing on Broadway shows, including Dr. Seuss' How the Grinch Stole Christmas!, Ragtime, Ghost The Musical, Pippin, Beautiful: The Carole King Musical, Cabin in the Sky, and Chicago.

In 2016, Hughes made her television debut with a series-regular role in the ABC comedy series American Housewife, playing, alongside Ali Wong, one of the title character's best friends. Hughes left the series after four seasons, saying in a November 2020 press statement, "I was no longer able to work in the toxic environment that was created on 'American Housewife.' I made the decision to leave to protect myself from that type of discrimination." An investigation by productions company ABC Signature led to "positive changes to the workplace and improvements to the culture", the company said in a statement in response, with series creator Sarah Dunn and line producer Mark J. Greenberg exiting the series. After leaving the series, Hughes was cast in her first leading role, in the Lifetime Christmas television movie The Christmas Edition.

Filmography

References

External links

African-American actresses
21st-century American actresses
American television actresses
American musical theatre actresses
Living people
Year of birth missing (living people)
Penn State College of Arts and Architecture alumni
21st-century African-American women singers